The Mixed synchronized 10 metre platform competition at the 2019 World Aquatics Championships was held on 13 July 2019.

Results
The final was started at 13:00.

References

Mixed synchronized 10 metre platform
World Aquatics Championships